Hjördís or Hiordis in Norse mythology is the wife of Sigmund, and the mother of Sigurd. Her father was a king named Eylimi.

She is mentioned in the Poetic Edda and the Prose Edda.

It is also a female given name in Scandinavia, as Hjördis in Sweden and Iceland,  and Hjørdis in Denmark and Norway, but has recently gained popularity as a female given name in Germany as Jördis.

As a given name
 Hjördis Piuva Andersson, Swedish-Tornedalian painter and writer
 Hjördis "Disa" Eythorsdottir, Iceland-born American bridge player
 Hjørdis Høsøien, Norwegian handball player
 Hjördis Levin (born 1930), Swedish historian and author
 Hjördis Nordin, Swedish gymnast and Olympic champion
 Hjördis Petterson, Swedish actress
 Hjördis Schymberg, Swedish coloratura and lyric soprano
 Hjördis Töpel, Swedish freestyle swimmer and diver

Other uses
 Hjørdis (TV series), a spin off of the Danish television series Rita
 Buxton Hjordis, a single-seat sailplane built by Slingsby Sailplanes Ltd

Germanic heroic legends
People in Norse mythology
Swedish feminine given names